Elkin Calle (born May 26, 1980) is a Colombian footballer currently playing for Cúcuta Deportivo of the Second Division of Colombia

Honours

Club
Atlético Nacional
Categoría Primera A (4): 1999, 2013-I, 2013-II, 2014-I
Copa Merconorte (1): 2000
Copa Colombia (2): 2012, 2013
Superliga Colombiana (1): 2012
Deportivo Cali
Copa Colombia (1): 2010

References

1980 births
Living people
Colombian footballers
Footballers from Medellín
Colombia international footballers
Categoría Primera A players
Atlético Nacional footballers
Envigado F.C. players
Tiro Federal footballers
Atlético Huila footballers
Deportivo Pereira footballers
Independiente Medellín footballers
Deportivo Cali footballers
Once Caldas footballers
Cúcuta Deportivo footballers
Colombian expatriate footballers
Expatriate footballers in Argentina
Association football fullbacks